Edna Independent School District is a public school district based in Edna, Texas (USA).

In 2009, the school district was rated "academically acceptable" by the Texas Education Agency.

Schools
 Edna High School (grades 9-12)
 Meadie Pumphrey Junior High (grades 6-8)
 Edna Elementary School (grades PK-5)

References

External links
 

School districts in Jackson County, Texas